Falkenhain is a former municipality in the Leipzig district in Saxony, Germany. On 1 January 2012, it merged with Hohburg, forming the new municipality of Lossatal.

References 

Former municipalities in Saxony
Leipzig (district)